Early parliamentary elections were held in the Federal Republic of Yugoslavia between 20 December 1992 and 3 January 1993, following changes to the constitution in September 1992. The Socialist Party of Serbia emerged as the largest party in Parliament, winning 47 of the 138 seats.

Results

References

1992 in Yugoslavia
1993 in Yugoslavia
Yugoslavia
Yugoslavia
1992 12
Yugoslavia
Yugoslavia